The Electronic Entertainment Expo 2010 (E3 2010) was the 16th E3 held. The event took place at the Los Angeles Convention Center in Los Angeles, California. It began on June 14, 2010, and ended on June 17, 2010, with 45,600 total attendees. There was also an E3 event held in Sony's PlayStation Home.

Layout
E3 2010 was held at the Los Angeles Convention Center with the show occupying the South and West Halls as well as the first floor.

West Hall
Sony Computer Entertainment and Nintendo had booths that were directly opposite of each other. Other notable developers and publishers located on this floor were Atlus, Atari, Bethesda, Sony Online Entertainment, and Capcom.

South Hall
The hall has three types of booths: large, medium and small. The large booths were occupied by Square Enix, MTV Games, Microsoft, Ubisoft, Disney Interactive Studios, and Electronic Arts. The medium booths were occupied by Sega, Konami, THQ, Warner Bros. Interactive, and Take-Two Interactive. The small booths were occupied by Namco Bandai and Tecmo Koei.

List of featured games
The current list of games that were featured at E3 2010:

Notable exhibitors list
The list of notable exhibitors, including Atari who returned after pulling out of E3 2009 at the last minute:

2K Games
Activision
Atari
Atlus
Bethesda
Capcom
Codemasters

Disney
EA
Eidos
Konami
LucasArts
Majesco Entertainment
Microsoft
Namco Bandai
Natsume
Nintendo
Paradox
Sega
SNK
Sony
Square Enix
Tecmo Koei
THQ
Ubisoft
Valve
Warner Bros.

Press conferences

Microsoft
Microsoft held its press conference on June 14. Phil Spencer, vice president of Microsoft Studios, hosted the event for Kinect, and Hideo Kojima was a notable speaker.

Electronic Arts
Electronic Arts' press conference took place on June 14. Chief Executive Officer, John Riccitiello, has billed E3 2010 as being the "Biggest and Best Ever [E3 Expo]". He also adds that "All the best games and all the best developers will be together in LA to unveil new titles and celebrate the creativity and new technology that makes gaming so much fun".

Ubisoft
Ubisoft held a press conference on June 14. Multiple games were featured, including Assassin's Creed: Brotherhood, Driver: San Francisco ,and Ghost Recon: Future Soldier. The conference was hosted by actor and comedian Joel McHale.

Nintendo
Nintendo held its conference on June 15. Shigeru Miyamoto appeared on stage and presented gameplay of their new game The Legend of Zelda: Skyward Sword, though control difficulties due to wireless interference occurred. Other notable speakers included Warren Spector, who went into detail about the upcoming game Epic Mickey. Satoru Iwata unveiled the upcoming Nintendo 3DS handheld system and allowed those in attendance to try it out.

Sony
Sony held its conference on June 15. The conference opened up, with Kaz Hirai talking about 3D, and Herman Hulst demoing Killzone 3. Sony also announced its plans to advertise PlayStation Move starting with a partnership with Coca-Cola. They also announced plans to start PlayStation Plus. LittleBigPlanet 2, Dead Space 2, and Tiger Woods PGA Tour 10 were demoed. Other games shown include Infamous 2, Medal of Honor, God of War: Ghost of Sparta, and Portal 2. The show closed with a teaser trailer, and demo for an upcoming Twisted Metal game.

Konami
Konami's press conference was held on June 16. The conference stood out with its numerous ill-received stunts and performances. In GameTrailers's top 15 most embarrassing moments of E3, they awarded the entire Konami press conference the award citing that they took up 10 of the 15 spots further referring to it as an "uncomfortable monstrosity".

Notable appearances

Hideo Kojima
Hideo Kojima, creator of the Metal Gear Solid series, made an appearance at Microsoft's press conference. Prior to that he attended the third annual PlayStation.Blog E3 Meetup and gave away free bundles of Metal Gear Solid: Peace Walker.

Tetsuya Nomura
Tetsuya Nomura, director of Final Fantasy XV (then known as Versus XIII) and series director of Kingdom Hearts, made an appearance at E3. In addition he is met with Square Enix's Osaka-based Product Development Group 5 which recently worked on Kingdom Hearts Birth by Sleep. This was revealed by Shinji Hashimoto, a Japanese game producer for Square Enix, on his Twitter account.

Other notable appearances
Japanese game developers Hideki Kamiya, Yuji Naka, Suda51, and Shinji Mikami all went to E3 2010. While American game director David Jaffe, head of Eat Sleep Play, was also in attendance. Olympian Shaun White made an appearance at Ubisoft's press conference to promote the game Shaun White Skateboarding

Pre-E3 hype

Valve
Valve claimed that they were going to be unveiling a "surprise" at E3 2010; they were originally set to hold an event regarding Portal 2 on June 14, 2010. The Portal 2 event was cancelled on June 1, 2010, with the "surprise" as its replacement. At Sony's press conference, the surprise was revealed to be Portal 2 on PlayStation 3, as well as Steamworks integration for the platform.

Square Enix
Square Enix claimed that they were going to be unveiling a new title in the Kingdom Hearts series; this was revealed by series director Tetsuya Nomura in an interview with Game Informer. This was revealed to be Kingdom Hearts 3D.

Game Critics Awards

The Game Critics Awards is an independent group of 31 North American media outlets that cover the videogame industry, consisting of sites such as Kotaku, Joystiq, GameSpot, IGN and GameTrailers. Each year they award games showcased at E3 with various titles, they are also officially recognized by the Entertainment Software Association, the organizer of E3.

References

2010 in Los Angeles
2010 in video gaming
2010
June 2010 events in the United States